Fatuha Junction railway station also known as Fatwa Junction, station code FUT, is a railway station in the Patna Metropolitan Region in Patna district in the Indian state of Bihar. Fatuha is connected to metropolitan areas of India, by the Delhi–Kolkata main line via Mugalsarai–Patna route. Another line for Islampur railway station which is in Nalanda District comes out from here. It is approx 44 km railway line. Railway has also passed a plan to increase this line further and connect it to Natesar railway station which is in Rajgir–Gaya railway section. Due to its location on the Howrah–Patna–Delhi main line, many Patna, Barauni-bound express trains coming from Howrah and Sealdah stop here.

Facilities 
The major facilities available are waiting rooms, computerized reservation facility. The station also has tea stall and book stall. There is also a railway goods yard, used in particular for conveyance of onions.

Platforms 
There are seven platforms at Fatuha Junction. The platforms are interconnected with single foot overbridge.
RELWEY 07

Trains 
Many passenger and express trains serve Fatuha station (as of 18 April 2012):

Nearest airports 

References

External links 
 Fatuha station map
 Official website of the Patna district

Railway junction stations in Bihar
Railway stations in Patna district
Danapur railway division
Railway stations opened in 1862
1862 establishments in India